Salme, Estonia is a small borough in Saaremaa Parish, Saare County, in western Estonia.

The Salme shipfind consisted of two clinker-built ships discovered in Salme, one with the remains of seven persons found in autumn 2008, and another with 33 in 2010.

The population of Salme as of January 1, 2016 was 1195.

References

Populated places in Saare County
Boroughs and small boroughs in Estonia